Joe Biden, a Democrat from Delaware, was elected President of the United States on November 3, 2020. He was inaugurated on January 20, 2021, as the nation's 46th president. The following articles cover the timeline of Joe Biden, and the time leading up to it:

 Pre-presidency: 2019–2021
 Joe Biden 2020 presidential campaign
 Presidential transition of Joe Biden
 Presidency: 2021
 First 100 days of Joe Biden's presidency
 Timeline of the Joe Biden presidency (2021 Q1)
 Timeline of the Joe Biden presidency (2021 Q2)
 Timeline of the Joe Biden presidency (2021 Q3) 
 Timeline of the Joe Biden presidency (2021 Q4)
 Presidency: 2022
 Timeline of the Joe Biden presidency (2022 Q1)
 Timeline of the Joe Biden presidency (2022 Q2)
 Timeline of the Joe Biden presidency (2022 Q3)
 Timeline of the Joe Biden presidency (2022 Q4)
 Presidency: 2023
 Timeline of the Joe Biden presidency (2023 Q1)

See also
 Timeline of the Donald Trump presidency, for his predecessor

 
Biden
Presidency of Joe Biden